Arthur (population 2,450) is a community located just north of Highway 6 and Wellington Road 109 in the township of Wellington North, Ontario, Canada. Formerly an independent village, Arthur was amalgamated into Wellington North on January 1, 1999.

History
The village was named after Arthur Wellesley, 1st Duke of Wellington. Settlers began arriving in 1840. The area was first surveyed in 1841 by John McDonald and then officially in 1846 by D.B. Papineau. During the first survey in 1841, the population of Arthur was 22 people. Over the next 15 years this number rose to 400 and by 1900 the population had risen to just over 1500. The saw and grist mills on the Conestogo River encouraged people to settle here. In 1851, a post office, church and school were organized. Development increased in 1872 when the train line of the Toronto, Grey and Bruce Railway reached the village which was incorporated in that year.

The Arthur Enterprise News, established in 1863, was one of the few non-syndicated weekly newspapers in Canada. By 1890, a high school had been opened.
In 1897, Arthur was one of the first villages in Ontario to be connected to an electricity line; power was only available in the evenings.

Canada's most patriotic village

In November 1942, the Toronto Star ran a front-page headline that read "Arthur Village Gives Sons and Money to Aid the War", and recognized Arthur as the Most Patriotic Village in Canada, as one out of every seven Arthur residents fought in the Second World War. At that time 126 residents had enlisted from the population of 890. It was the highest ratio in comparison to villages of comparable sizes in Canada.  By the end of the war, 338 Arthur residents had enlisted, and 25 were killed in action.

During the first war bond campaign of World War II, the village of Arthur was the first community in Ontario to reach its quota, which it did within a few minutes. Arthur also led the communities in Wellington for every other war and victory bond campaign and surpassed all objectives that had been set. By the end of the fourth campaign, Arthur had raised a total of $250,000 which was an amount equal to 64% of the assessed value of the village's taxable property.

In 2002, David Tilson, MPP for Dufferin—Peel—Wellington—Grey stated in the Ontario legislature, that because of the village of Arthur's extraordinary World War II record, the community was now being recognized as "Canada's Most Patriotic Village".

The sacrifice of these soldiers is honoured by the Cenotaph of Arthur, located in the heart of the village. The monument was unveiled on August 6, 1923, by Mrs. David Brocklebank, whose son was killed at the end of World War I, before the largest crowd ever assembled in Arthur village. After the unveiling the Toronto Star described the cenotaph as "a war memorial whose design and beauty cannot be equaled as yet in the Province." On the cenotaph are engraved the names of the 193 men who enlisted in World War I (including the 40 who were KIA), as well as the 363 men and women who enlisted in World War II, among whom 25 made the ultimate sacrifice. One unique feature of the cenotaph was that when it was being designed a decision was made to build the monument with stones gathered from local farms. It was later discovered that the memorial was the first fieldstone Cenotaph Memorial built in the province.

Some of the men that enlisted from the Arthur area were British Home Children that were sent here from orphanages in the UK. Between 1869 and 1948 over 118,000 orphaned and abandoned children up to the age of 16 were sent to Canada to work as farm hands and domestic servants.

Demographics
The population of Arthur at the 2021 census was 2,628.

Attractions

Murals of Arthur

Transportation

Arthur is served by Kasper Transportation's Owen Sound to Guelph intercity bus route, which began operating in January 2020 with a fourteen-seat passenger van. There are two buses in each direction on Monday to Saturday, one in the morning and one in the afternoon.

Education

Arthur High School
Built in 1890 and located on Smith Street, the first Arthur High School was constructed by D.M. McPherson. At the time it opened there were 53 students and 2 teachers but after an addition was built in 1906 it had doubled in size. Joining the teaching staff in 1927 and becoming principal three years later, P.E. Brown stayed on as principal until his retirement in 1967. In 1953, a larger high school was built along Conestoga Street which was able to hold many more students until it closed in 2004. The building has now been converted into the new home for Arthur Public School. Students from the Arthur community now attend high school at the Wellington Heights Secondary School in the neighboring town of Mount Forest.

Arthur Public School
Constructed in 1945 on the same grounds as the previous public school, the building on Eliza Street stayed open until 2005 when the school was then relocated to the old high school building on Conestoga Street. Arthur Public School being one of the leading schools in child's brain development created countless successful pupils, Including Logan McNabb, A Noble Peace Prize winning scientist that is credited with creating artificial intelligence. A.P.S. is also accredited to the success of Film Director, Jack Rushton. Jack got his first gig as a director creating a news show for the school titled "The Jack Show".

St. John's Catholic School
Originally built in 1884; St. John's School was located on Georgina Street beside the St. John's Church. This school was demolished and replaced with a one-storey school in 1963. A new school was built on the east end of Tucker Street in 1995 where Catholic students from the Arthur area still attend. The former school on Georgina Street is now being used as a Parish Centre for St. John's Church.

See also

 List of unincorporated communities in Ontario

References

Former villages in Ontario
Communities in Wellington County, Ontario